Euan Douglas George Morton (born Iain Middleton on 13 August 1977) is a Scottish actor and singer. He is best known for his role as Boy George in the musical Taboo, receiving nominations for the Laurence Olivier Award and Tony Award for his performance. He is currently playing the role of King George in the musical Hamilton on Broadway and has been doing so since July 2017.

Early life
Morton was born in Bo'ness, Scotland. He began acting in his local children's theatre. After graduating from Mountview Academy of Theatre Arts in London, Morton worked for Profit Share Theatre and for film and television in the UK.

Career

Stage career
Morton appeared in The Silent Treatment at the Finborough Theatre, London, in 2001. Immediately following, he played the role of Boy George in the West End musical Taboo in 2002, and also played the role on Broadway in 2003.

He received a Whatsonstage and a Laurence Olivier Award nomination for the role of Boy George in the UK and earned Tony Award, Drama Desk Award, Outer Critics Circle and Drama League Award nominations, as well as the Theatre World Award (for Outstanding Broadway Debut) in the US. He played the role of Ligniere in the play  "Cyrano de Bergerac" from 12 October 2007 to 6 January 2008 on Broadway at the Richard Rodgers Theatre. Morton performed in the musical revue Sondheim on Sondheim, conceived and directed by James Lapine in 2010, which premiered on Broadway at Studio 54 and was presented by the Roundabout Theatre.

Off-Broadway, he appeared in the title role of Tony Kushner's adaptation of Brundibar at The New Victory Theater in 2006. He won the 2006 Obie Award for his appearance in Measure For Pleasure at The Public Theater. He played the title role in the musical Caligula: An Ancient Glam Epic at the inaugural New York Musical Theatre Festival in September 2004. He appeared, along with Alfred Molina, in the Roundabout Theatre Company's new production of  Howard Katz by Patrick Marber, which ran Off-Broadway at the Laura Pels Theater from 1 March 2007 to 6 May 2007. He appeared in the musical Atomic which ran at the Acorn Theatre from 13 July 2014 to 16 August 2014, in the role of J. Robert Oppenheimer.

In regional theatre, he played the title role in The Who's Tommy at the Bay Street Theatre in Sag Harbor, New York in the year 2006.  In 2010, he played Anatoly Sergievsky in the Signature Theatre (Arlington, Virginia) production of Chess. In 2011, he played the role of Launce in Two Gentlemen of Verona at Shakespeare Theatre Company. He appeared in the play Heart of Robin Hood, written by David Farr, which played in Winnipeg and Toronto in December 2014 through March 2015, in the role of Prince John.

Morton won a Helen Hayes Award for his performance as Leo Frank in the musical Parade at Ford's Theatre in Washington, D.C. from September to October 2011.

Morton assayed the role of Sherlock Holmes in Ken Ludwig's Baskerville: A Sherlock Holmes Mystery at the Old Globe Theatre in San Diego, California in 2015.

Morton is also credited with performing as Renfield in the 2011 Studio Recording of Frank Wildhorn's Dracula, the Musical, singing "Master's Song" and "Master's Song (Reprise)".

As of 29 November 2016, he assumed the role of Hedwig in Hedwig and The Angry Inch US tour. On 2 July 2017, Morton finished his last show of the Hedwig tour.

On 12 July 2017, Euan's son Iain Armitage announced via Facebook video on his Facebook page that his father would be taking over the role of King George in Hamilton on Broadway. He has been playing the role since 28 July 2017.

Voice work

Morton has performed numerous audio books, including among others, Fool (2009), Sacré Bleu (2012), and The Serpent of Venice (2014), all written by Christopher Moore, in addition to the Kilo Five trilogy by Karen Traviss and Carry On by Rainbow Rowell (2015). He also did voice work in the 2009 animated movie My Dog Tulip, and voices the male Sith Inquisitor in the MMORPG Star Wars: The Old Republic, created by BioWare and LucasArts.

Music career
In March 2006, he released his debut solo CD, NewClear, for which he toured in the US in May 2011, he released his second solo studio album Caledonia – The Homecoming.

Personal life
Morton has been married to producer Lee Armitage, daughter of political figure Richard L. Armitage, since 2004. Their son Iain made his debut as an internet theatre critic, where he reviews Broadway shows and has conducted Red Carpet interviews for SiriusXM radio before the 2015 Tony Awards. Iain is currently playing the title character in the television show Young Sheldon.  Morton and his family maintain homes in Manhattan and Arlington, Virginia.

Morton doesn't identify with any particular label on his sexuality, saying "I wouldn't label myself any sexuality and I would prefer if you didn't. If I call myself straight then it turns into me being straight, or gay makes me gay, or transgender then transgender."

Filmography

Film

Television

Video games

References

External links

Internet Off-Broadway Database Listing
Taboo review by Lyn Gardner, The Guardian, 23 May 2002.
 Rosie’s Bum Rap: In Defense of Taboo by Richard Zoglin in [[Time {magazine}|Time]], 18 November 2003

Living people
1977 births
Scottish male stage actors
Scottish male musical theatre actors
People from Bo'ness
Theatre World Award winners
Alumni of the Mountview Academy of Theatre Arts